Pryeria is a genus of moths belonging to the family Zygaenidae.

The species of this genus are found in Southeastern Asia.

Species
Species:

Pryeria simonyi 
Pryeria sinica 
Pryeria sylviae

References

Zygaenidae
Zygaenidae genera